Larry Corowa MBE (born 5 August 1957 in Murwillumbah, New South Wales) is an Indigenous Australian former professional rugby league footballer who played in the 1970s, 1980s and 1990s. An Australian international and New South Wales representative winger, he played club football at the Balmain Tigers for six seasons between 1978 and 1983, with two games for the Gold Coast Seagulls in the 1991 New South Wales Rugby League Premiership. Playing on the wing, Corowa became one of Rugby League's most prolific try scorers of his era. He is one of a select few players to have scored more than a try a game in a season of football in Australia.

He was appointed Member of the Order of the British Empire (MBE) in the 1980 New Year Honours for service to sport.

Playing career
In his first season with Balmain, he was the League's top try-scorer. At the end of his debut season with Balmain in 1978 in which he scored 24 tries, Larry Corowa was selected as a member of the 1978 Kangaroo tour, though he did not play a test on tour. He made his test debut for Australia during the 1979 Ashes series against the touring Great Britain Lions at Lang Park in Brisbane with the Kangaroos winning 35-0. He played in the first two games of the series for his only test appearances, scoring a try on debut at Lang Park. Nicknamed "The Black Flash", Corowa was considered during his time with Balmain to be 'the fastest player in the game' not only in Australia but the rest of the rugby league world. Larry Corowa is listed on the Australian Players Register as Kangaroo No. 516.

After retiring from First Grade league following the 1983 season, Corowa moved to the Gold Coast and became involved with the Gold Coast Seagulls. In 1991, at the age of 34 and after nine years in retirement, he played two games for the Seagulls, scoring a single try to take his overall tally to 65 from 100 games before retiring permanently.

Post-playing
In 2003, Corowa was one of 19 players named in the Balmain Tigers Team of the Century. The Larry Corowa Shield is awarded to the winner of the Wests Tigers - Gold Coast Titans pre-season trial match. The inaugural match, played in 2008, was won by the Titans. Corowa retains a strong involvement with Indigenous Rugby League and has been an Australia Day Ambassador.

References

Sources

External links
Vibe Australia profile
Larry Corowa  reachout.com.au interview

1957 births
Living people
Australia national rugby league team players
Australian Members of the Order of the British Empire
Australian rugby league players
Balmain Tigers players
Gold Coast Chargers players
Indigenous Australian rugby league players
Rugby league players from Murwillumbah
Rugby league wingers